The Society for Mathematical Biology (SMB) is an international association co-founded in 1972 in the United States by George Karreman, Herbert Daniel Landahl and (initially chaired) by Anthony Bartholomay for the furtherance of joint scientific activities between Mathematics and Biology research communities. The society publishes the Bulletin of Mathematical Biology, as well as the quarterly SMB newsletter.

History of The Society for Mathematical Biology
The Society for Mathematical Biology emerged and grew from the earlier school of mathematical biophysics, initiated and supported by the Founder of Mathematical Biology, Nicolas Rashevsky. Thus, the roots of SMB go back to the publication in 1939 of the first international journal of mathematical biology, previously entitled "The Bulletin of Mathematical Biophysics"—which was founded by Nicolas Rashevsky, and which is currently published by SMB under the name of "Bulletin of Mathematical Biology". Professor Rashevsky also founded in 1969 the non-profit organization "Mathematical Biology, Incorporated"—the precursor of SMB. Another notable member of the University of Chicago school of mathematical biology was Anatol Rapoport whose major interests were in developing basic concepts in the related area of mathematical sociology, who cofounded the Society for General Systems Research and became a president of the latter society in 1965. Herbert D. Landahl was initially also a member of Rashevsky's school of mathematical biology, and became  the second president of SMB in the 1980s; both Herbert Landahl and Robert Rosen from Rashevsky's research group were focused on dynamical systems approaches to complex systems biology, with the latter researcher becoming in 1980 the president of the Society for General Systems Research.

Leadership of The Society for Mathematical Biology 
The Society for Mathematical Biology is governed by its Officers and Board of Directors, elected by the membership. Current SMB President is Heiko Enderling (Moffitt Cancer Center), and Past-President serving as Vice President is Alexander R.A. Anderson (Moffitt Cancer Center). SMB secretary is Gibin Powathil (Swansea University), and treasurer is Jana Gevertz (The College of New Jersey).  
The current Board of Directors is composed of Peter Kim (University of Sydney), Doron Levy (University of Maryland), Elissa Schwartz (Washington State University), Ruth Baker (University of Oxford), Zhilan Feng (Purdue University), and Amber Smith (University of Tennessee Health Science Center).

Research and educational activities 

In addition to its research and news publications, the society supports education in: mathematical biology, mathematical biophysics, complex systems biology and theoretical biology through sponsorship of several topic-focused graduate and postdoctoral courses. To encourage and stimulate young researchers in this relatively new and rapidly developing field of mathematical biology, the society awards several prizes, as well as lists regularly new open international opportunities for researchers and students in this field.

The society publishes the Bulletin of Mathematical Biology, as well as the SMB annual newsletter.

References

Further reading
 Nicolas Rashevsky. 1965. The Representation of Organisms in Terms of Predicates, Bulletin of Mathematical Biophysics 27: 477–491.
 Nicolas Rashevsky. 1969, Outline of a Unified Approach to Physics, Biology and Sociology., Bulletin of Mathematical Biophysics 31: 159–198.
 Elsasser, M.W.: 1981, A Form of Logic Suited for Biology., In: Robert, Rosen, ed., Progress in Theoretical Biology, Volume 6, Academic Press, New York and London, pp. 23–62.
 Rosen, R. 1958a, A Relational Theory of Biological Systems., Bulletin of Mathematical Biophysics 20: 245–260.
 Rosen, R. 1958b, The Representation of Biological Systems from the Standpoint of the Theory of Categories., Bulletin of Mathematical Biophysics 20: 317–341.
 Warren McCulloch and Walter Pitts, "A Logical Calculus of Ideas Immanent in Nervous Activity", 1943, Bulletin of Mathematical Biophysics 5:115-133.
 Warren McCulloch and Walter Pitts, "On how we know universals: The perception of auditory and visual forms", 1947, Bulletin of Mathematical Biophysics 9:127-147.
 Santiago Schnell, Ramon Grima and Philip K. Maini. 2007. Multiscale modeling in biology. American Scientist 95: 134-142.

External links
 The Society for Mathematical Biology
 Bulletin of Mathematical Biology
 "In Memory of George Karreman."—the first SMB President,  by Paul De Weer.
 SMB home page
 IFSR Home page of "The International Federation for Systems Research" (IFSR)
 European Society for Mathematical and Theoretical Biology (ESMTB)
 The Centre for Mathematical Biology (CMB) at the University of Oxford

Mathematical and theoretical biology
Molecular biology
Bioinformatics organizations
Systems biology
Physiology organizations